The Australian GT Championship is a CAMS-sanctioned national title for drivers of GT cars, held annually from 1960 to 1963, from 1982 to 1985 and from 2005. Each championship up to and including the 1963 title was contested over a single race and those after that year over a series of races. The categories which have contested the championship have not always been well defined and often have become a home for cars orphaned by category collapse or a sudden change in regulation.

History

Appendix K

In the first era the championship races were open to closed roof cars (not necessarily production based) complying with CAMS Appendix K regulations. Appendix K catered for modified production Grand Touring cars (such as Lotus Elite), sports cars (such as Jaguar D-Type) fitted with roofs, specials (such as the Centaur Waggott) and touring cars modified beyond the limits of the then current Appendix J regulations. Numbers dropped rapidly away as the years went on and both the category and the championship were discontinued at the end of 1963.

GT and Sports Sedan
From 1976 to 1981 the Australian Sports Car Championship had been contested by Group D Production Sports Cars. The re-introduction of Group A Sports Cars in 1982 saw Group D needing a new home. The Australian GT Championship was re-introduced as a home for both Group D and Group B Sports Sedans of the Australian Sports Sedan Championship (ASSC). The category was something of a hybrid with European racing cars, American IMSA racers and wide variety of Australian Sports Sedans competing together. One major difference between the Sports Sedans and GT cars was that the Sports Sedans were restricted to 10" wheels where as the GT cars were allowed up to 18" of rubber. Although many of the top V8 sports sedans had similar power to the GT cars, the difference in rubber on the road saw the GT cars able to get their power to the ground much more efficiently and also go much faster through the turns.

Porsche 935's dominated early with  Formula One World Champion Alan Jones winning the 1982 Championship in an entry backed by former race driver Alan Hamilton's Porsche Cars Australia (Hamilton was Australia's major Porsche distributor at the time). Porsche won again in 1983, this time with Rusty French driving the 1982 title winning car he had acquired from Hamilton, while both the 1984 and 1985 championships were won by Allan Grice and Bryan Thomson respectively, both driving the ex-Bob Jane DeKon Chevrolet Monza with a 6.0 L V8 engine that produced a reported , with Thomson also driving his exotic Chevrolet V8 powered twin turbo Mercedes-Benz 450 SLC in the 1985 series. The Thomson Mercedes was alleged to produce over  making it arguably the most powerful race car in Australian motor racing. The downside though was that without a large budget, the Thompson Mercedes suffered numerous reliability problems (usually turbo) and neither Thompson nor his team driver (1985–86) Brad Jones, or indeed John Bowe who had also driven the car in the early 1980s while Thompson was in a short lived retirement, were able to show its true potential.

As time went on the usually slower Sports Sedans started to usurp the category as the more expensive Sports Car refugees dropped in numbers. Sports Sedans also became more effective, especially once local racing car factories and professional racing teams like the Adelaide based Elfin Sports Cars and K&A Engineering, and top level touring car teams such as Alan Browne's Re-Car team and former ASSC Frank Gardner's JPS Team BMW became involved. As with Appendix K of the 1960s, grids were widely varied with turbocharged Porsche 935s, BMW 318is, 5.0 and 6.0 litre V8 powered Chevrolet Monzas, Holden Commodores, Alfa Romeo Alfettas, Thomson's lone Mercedes-Benz 450 SLC, Peter Fitzgerald's non-turbo Porsche Carrera RSR, a couple of V12 Jaguar XJS' and with a variety of sports sedans such as the Holden Monaro and Holden Torana, Ford Falcon and Ford Escort, and various turbocharged Toyotas, Nissans and Mazda RX-7s.

By 1985 the field was mostly Sports Sedans bolstered with recently obsolete (from the end of 1984) Group C Touring Cars and the championship was run concurrently with the Australian Sports Car Championship. Veteran driver Kevin Bartlett introduced a very quick Ground effects De Tomaso Pantera in 1985 which brought some much needed spice to the GT category.

For 1986 Sports Sedans went their own way. Within a couple of years Porsche drivers had their own series with the Porsche Cup.

GT3 and GT4

The Australian GT Championship was revived a second time in 2005 after the disbandment of the Australian Nations Cup Championship. Most of the competing 2004 cars remained eligible for 2005, although the controversial Holden Monaro 427C's which had won the two Bathurst 24 Hour races in 2002 and 2003 were a notable exception. This was because the Monaros under Nations Cup rules had been permitted to use the 7.0 litre, 427 cui LS6 Chevrolet V8 engine that had been used successfully in the Chevrolet Corvette C5-R, while the road going CV8 Monaros only came with the 5.7-litre Gen III V8. The Australian Porsche Drivers Challenge (the former Australian Porsche Cup) also was merged into the GT Championship.

The FIA GT3 regulations, like those in use in the FIA GT3 European Championship was the core of the new series. The series vehicles reflected GT3, Porsches, Ferraris, Lamborghinis, the controversial Mosler, although series regulations usually specified cars be two-three years old to cut down on costs. Competing drivers are seeded and penalised so as not to flood the series with professional drivers from other categories and increasing there has been an emphasis on longer races, sometimes allowing for more than one driver per car.

The series has grown steadily, helped by the transition of the Bathurst 12 Hour race from a production car race to a GT race. Manufacturers have diversified widely from its mostly Porsche base and in addition to the 12 Hour has also seen the creation of other long distance races, the Phillip Island 101 and the Highlands 101 in New Zealand.

The Australian GT Trophy Series was introduced as a support series in 2016, featuring older-specification GT3, GT4, Challenge and MARC cars. GT4 cars will be integrated into the main championship in 2018.

Circuits

 Current

  Adelaide Street Circuit (2007–2013, 2015–2017, 2022)
  Mount Panorama Circuit (1960, 2006–2007, 2009–2011, 2013, 2019–present)
  Phillip Island Grand Prix Circuit (2005–2019, 2021–present)
  Queensland Raceway (2005–2007, 2013, 2016–2017, 2022)
  Sandown Raceway (1983–1984, 2007–2008, 2010–2011, 2014–2020, 2022)
  The Bend Motorsport Park (2018–2019, 2021–present)

 Former

  Adelaide International Raceway (1982–1985)
  Albert Park Circuit (2008–2010, 2016–2019)
  Baskerville Raceway (1982)
  Calder Park Raceway (1963, 1982–1985)
  Hampton Downs Motorsport Park (2016–2018)
  Highlands Motorsport Park (2013–2016)
  Homebush Street Circuit (2009, 2012)
  Lakeside International Raceway (1962, 1982–1985)
  Mallala Motor Sport Park (2006)
  Oran Park Raceway (1982, 1985, 2006–2007)
  Reid Park Street Circuit (2011, 2014–2017)
  Surfers Paradise International Raceway (1982–1985)
  Surfers Paradise Street Circuit (2012, 2019)
  Sydney Motorsport Park (2005–2015, 2018, 2020)
  Symmons Plains Raceway (1982, 2007)
  Wakefield Park (2005–2006, 2017)
  Wanneroo Raceway (1982, 2016–2017, 2019)
  Warwick Farm Raceway (1961)
  Winton Motor Raceway (1982–1985, 2011–2012, 2016–2017)

Champions

Multiple winners

By driver

By manufacturer

Notes
  – In 1985, the champion Bryan Thomson drove both a Chevrolet Monza and a Chevrolet powered Mercedes-Benz.

See also
 Australian GT Trophy Series

References
 A History of Australian Motor Sport,  1980
 Australian Motor Racing Yearbooks, 1982/83 to 1985/86
 www.camsmanual.com.au
 www.gtchampionship.com.au

External links
 CAMS Manual on Line
 Australian GT website

 
GT
GT
Group GT3
1960 establishments in Australia
1963 disestablishments in Australia
1982 establishments in Australia
1985 disestablishments in Australia
2005 establishments in Australia
Sports leagues established in 1957
Sports leagues established in 1982
Sports leagues established in 2005